29 Vulpeculae is a suspected astrometric binary star system in the northern constellation Vulpecula. It is visible to the naked eye as a faint, white-hued point of light with an apparent visual magnitude of 4.82. The system lies approximately 209 light years away from the Sun based on parallax, and is a member of the IC 2391 supercluster. It is moving closer to the Earth with a heliocentric radial velocity of −17 km/s.

Radial velocity measurements from High Accuracy Radial Velocity Planet Searcher with an amplitude of 4 km/s indicate that it is a spectroscopic binary of unknown period. The visible component is an A-type main-sequence star with a stellar classification of A0V, and has some slight abundance anomalies that resemble a weak Am star. It is catalogued as a shell star, showing spectral features of a cooler circumstellar jacket of gas, and may be a proto-shell star. The star is an estimated 254 million years old with a relatively low projected rotational velocity of 52 km/s. It has 2.67 times the mass of the Sun and is radiating 71 times the Sun's luminosity from its photosphere at an effective temperature of 10,507 K.

References

A-type main-sequence stars
Shell stars
Spectroscopic binaries
Vulpecula
Durchmusterung objects
Vulpeculae, 29
196724
101867
7891